Martyn Andrew Grimley (born 24 February 1963) is a former field hockey player.

He won gold with the Great Britain squad at the 1988 Summer Olympics in Seoul. He also has World Cup and Champions Trophy silver medals with England as well as silver medals with both European Cup silver medals with both indoor and outdoor squads. He has a combined total of 178 international caps for England and Great Britain.

Grimley was born in Halifax, England. He taught Physical Education at Banbury School in Oxfordshire for a short time between 1986–87 and then taught geography, Physical Education and Outdoor Education while at Dulwich College in London. Since returning from the Olympics in 1988 he joined Zurich Financial Services and has since become a company director running a Cheshire - based financial services business 'Warriner & Co Ltd'. He is a life member of Brooklands Manchester University Hockey Club.

In 2018 he became Cheshire Seniors Strokeplay Golf Champion with a first time victory at Bromborough Golf Club and also won the Cheshire Seniors Matchplay Championship in 2019. He currently has a plus one (+1) handicap and is the President of the Cheshire Union of Golf Clubs for 2022.

Still on Secret double probation for the Donegal Trophy.

References

External links
 
 

1963 births
Living people
English male field hockey players
English Olympic medallists
Olympic field hockey players of Great Britain
British male field hockey players
Olympic gold medallists for Great Britain
Field hockey players at the 1988 Summer Olympics
English field hockey coaches
Olympic medalists in field hockey
Sportspeople from Halifax, West Yorkshire
Medalists at the 1988 Summer Olympics
1990 Men's Hockey World Cup players